The following is a list of chamber jazz musicians.

A
Philip Aaberg - piano
William Ackerman - guitar
Sinan Alimanović - piano
Darol Anger - violin

B
Pierre Bensusan - guitar
John Boswell

C
Jim Chappell
Billy Childs - piano
Hans Christian
Scott Cossu

D
Eddie Daniels - sax, clarinet
Alex de Grassi - guitar

F
Mark Feldman - violin
Erik Friedlander - cello
Eugene Friesen - cello

G
Tord Gustavsen - piano

H
Paul Halley
Chico Hamilton - drums

I
Mark Isham - trumpet

J
Mike Jones

L
Adrian Legg - guitar
Brian Landrus - baritone saxophone, bass clarinet, bass flute
Jacques Loussier - piano

M
Michael Manring - bass guitar
Masada String Trio
Paul McCandless - oboe, bass clarinet, English horn, and soprano saxophone
John McLaughlin - guitar
Montreux
Glen Moore - double bass

N
Nightnoise

O
Oregon

P
Paul Winter Consort
Penguin Cafe Orchestra

R
Ralph Towner - guitar, piano

S
Louis Sclavis - sax, clarinet
Shadowfax
Robin Spielberg
Peter Sprague - guitar

T
Tingstad & Rumbel
Ralph Towner - twelve-string guitar, classical guitar, piano, synthesizer, percussion, and trumpet
Trapezoid

W
Collin Walcott - tabla, sitar
Russel Walder - oboe
Eberhard Weber - double-bass
Paul Winter

See also

List of jazz musicians

References

External links

 Chamber
 
Chamber